PNG Air is an airline based on the grounds of Jacksons International Airport, Port Moresby, Papua New Guinea. It operates scheduled domestic and international flights, as well as contract corporate charter work. Its main base is Jacksons International Airport.

History 
The airline was originally established and started operations in 1987 as Milne Bay Air. It operated as a charter company in the resource development industry. The airline obtained an RPT (scheduled passenger services) licence in September 1992 and received its airline licence in March 1997. With its headquarters and main operating base set in Port Moresby, there are also support staff in Cairns, Australia. PNG Air has 750 staff. In 2008 the airline was listed on the Port Moresby Stock Exchange.

In November 2015, the airline rebranded and unveiled a new livery. It also received its first ATR 72-600 aircraft, to become the backbone of the fleet by 2020.

Destinations 
PNG Air operates scheduled passenger flights to the following destinations:

Papua New Guinea
 Alotau – Gurney Airport
 Buka – Buka Airport
 Daru – Daru Airport
 Goroka – Goroka Airport
 Hoskins – Hoskins Airport
 Kiunga – Kiunga Airport
 Aropa – Kieta Airport
 Kavieng – Kavieng Airport
 Lae – Lae Airport
 Lihir Island – Kunaye Airport
 Losuia – Losuia Airport
 Madang – Madang Airport
 Misima – Misima Airport
 Moro – Moro Airport
 Mount Hagen – Mount Hagen Airport
 Popondetta – Girua Airport
 Port Moresby – Jacksons International Airport hub
 Rabaul / Kokopo – Rabaul Airport
 Tabubil – Tabubil Airport
 Tari – Tari Airport
 Vanimo – Vanimo Airport
 Wewak – Wewak Airport
Wapenamanda – Wapenamanda Airport

Australia
Cairns – Cairns Airport

Future Destinations
 Kepulauan Aru – Benjina Airport

Fleet 

The PNG Air fleet consists of the following aircraft (as of February 2020):

Incidents and accidents
On 15 December 1992, a Milne Bay Air Britten-Norman Islander aircraft struck a mountain near Alotau, Papua New Guinea. Six people were killed.
On 12 July 1995, a Milne Bay Air de Havilland Canada DHC-6 Twin Otter aircraft exploded and crashed into shallow water shortly after takeoff from Dagura Airport. Thirteen people were killed.
On 11 May 1996, a Milne Bay Air Britten-Norman Islander flew into a valley surrounded by high terrain near Oumba. Pilot attempted a 180 degree turn, but crashed into trees. One passenger was killed.
On 9 July 1996, a Milne Bay Air Twin Otter aircraft struck a mountain in cloudy conditions on approach to Mendi. Twenty people were killed.
On 29 July 2004, an Airlines PNG Twin Otter crashed near Ononge, in cloudy conditions, killing two people.
On 11 August 2009, Airlines PNG Flight 4684, a Twin Otter, made a failed go-around in cloudy conditions near Kokoda.  The aircraft crashed into a mountain at an altitude of 5500 feet (1676 metres). All 13 people on board were killed.
On 13 October 2011, a Dash 8-100, registration P2-MCJ, operating Airlines PNG Flight 1600 from Lae to Madang crashed about 20 km south of Madang and caught fire, killing 28 of the 32 people on board.

External links

 Official Website

References

Airlines of Papua New Guinea
Airlines established in 1987
1987 establishments in Oceania